Alcohol rub can refer to:

Hand sanitizer
Heat rub containing alcohol
Liniment
Rubbing alcohol
Witch hazel (astringent)

See also
Rub Me With Alcohol, a song by Andy Montañez